Jaromír Hanzlík (born 16 February 1948) is a Czech actor.

Selected filmography

Film
 Coach to Vienna (1966)
 Romance for Bugle (1967)
 Maratón (1968)
 Slasti Otce vlasti (1969)
 The Joke (1969)
 A Night at Karlstein (1973)
 How to Drown Dr. Mracek, the Lawyer (1974)
 Léto s kovbojem (1976)
 The Ninth Heart (1979)
 Cutting It Short (1980)
 The Snowdrop Festival (1984)
 The End of Old Times (1989)
 Men in Rut (2009)
 Gangster Ka (2015)

Television
 Taková normální rodinka (1971)
 Byl jednou jeden dům (1975)
 Žena za pultem (1977) 
 Plechová kavalérie (1979) 
 Sanitka (1984) 
 Cirkus Humberto (1988)
 Tajemství rodu (2013)

References

External links
 

 
1948 births
Living people
People from Český Těšín
Czech male film actors
Czech male stage actors
Czech male voice actors
Czech male television actors
21st-century Czech male actors
20th-century Czech male actors